CH Cygni (CH Cyg / HIP 95413 / BD +49 2999) is a red giant, variable, symbiotic binary in the constellation Cygnus. It is the nearest symbiotic star to Earth, and one of the brightest, making it an ideal candidate for study.

Properties
CH Cygni is classified as M7IIIab + Be.

Observation history

The earliest observations of CH Cygni were made in 1890 by Pickering and Wendel using wedge photometer, and was classified as a M6III variable star in 1924. In 1963 strong H I emissions were observed, indicating CH Cygni was likely in a symbiotic relationship with a white dwarf. Similar emissions were observed in 1965, 1967, 1977, 1992, and 1998. The system was briefly thought to contain a third star but this was later disproved.

In 1984 bipolar jets were detected coming from CH Cygni, which were suspected to be due to accretion from its companion star. The luminosity of the system decreased significantly in 1986, likely owing to dust thrown out of the system by the jets or a concurrent helium flash. This dust had dissipated by 2002, with subsequent luminosities returning to pre-1985 levels.

References

Cygnus (constellation)
M-type giants
182917
095413
Durchmusterung objects
Z Andromedae variables
Cygni, CH
Semiregular variable stars